Raymond Haroutioun Kévorkian (born February 22, 1953) is a French Armenian historian. He is a Foreign Member of Armenian National Academy of Sciences. Kevorkian has a PhD in history (1980), and is a professor.

Biography
Kevorkian finished the University of Paris VIII: Vincennes - Saint-Denis, where he teaches and serves as Research director at the French Institute of Geopolitics (Institut Français de Géopolitique). He is the editor of d'Histoire arménienne contemporaine journal.

Kevorkian is the author of The Armenian Genocide: A Complete History, "an exhaustive and authoritative account of the origins, events, and consequences of the Armenian Genocide". It was originally published in French in 2006. The book is the first to make extensive use of the archives of the Nubarian Library.

In 2010, Kevorkian received the Presidential Award from Armenian President Serge Sarkisian in recognition of his enormous contributions as a scholar. He is a member of Société de Géographie and a board member of International Association for Armenian Studies.

In 2015, he received the French Legion of Honor.

Bibliography 
 Le livre arménien à travers les âges, with Jean-Pierre Mahé, Catalogue de l'Exposition Marseille 1985 : Le livre arménien à travers les âges. 1985.
 Catalogue des « incunables » arméniens, 1511-1695 ou Chronique de l'imprimerie arménienne, with Jean-Pierre Mahé, Genève : P. Cramer. 1986.
 Les Imprimés arméniens des XVIe et XVIIe :: catalogue, Bibliothèque Nationale de France. 1987.
 Arménie : 3000 ans d'histoire, with Jean-Pierre Mahé, Maison armenienne de la jeunesse et de la culture. 1988.
 Les Imprimés arméniens : 1701-1850, Bibliothèque Nationale de France. 1989.
 Tapis et textiles arméniens, with Berdj Achdjian, Maison armenienne de la jeunesse et de la culture. 1991.
 Les Arméniens dans l'Empire ottoman à la veille du génocide, with Paul B. Paboudjian, Paris : Arhis. 1992.
 Arménie entre Orient et Occident : trois mille ans de civilisation, Bibliothèque Nationale de France. 1996.
 Manuscrits arméniens de la Bibliothèque nationale de France : catalogue, with  Bernard Outtier, Bibliothèque Nationale de France. 1998.
 Parler les camps, Penser les génocides, Albin Michel. 1999
 Translation of Histoire de la médecine en Arménie : de l'Antiquité à nos jours », Union médicale arménienne de France. 1999.
 Ani, capitale de l'Arménie en l'an 1000, Paris-Musées. 2001
 Les Yeux Brûlants — Mémoire des Arméniens, with Antoine Agoudjian, Actes sud. 2006
 Le Génocide des Arméniens, Odile Jacob. 2006.
 Les Arméniens 1917-1939 — La quête d'un refuge, with Vahé Tachjian et Lévon Nordiguian, Presses de l Université Saint-Joseph (Lebanon). 2006
 Lumière de l'Arménie chrétienne, with Yvan Travert, éditions du patrimoine. 2006.
 Un siècle de l'Union Générale Arménienne de Bienfaisance, Vol. 1, 1906-1940, with Vahé Tachjian, Union Générale Arménienne de Bienfaisance. 2006.
 Une mémoire arménienne, with Yervant Der Goumcian, Direction du Patrimoine du Conseil général de l’Isère. 2007.

References

Further reading

External links  
 Raymond Kevorkian works from Armenian Cultural Association of Marne-la-Vallée (France)

1953 births
Ethnic Armenian historians
20th-century French historians
French people of Armenian descent
Living people
Armenian studies scholars
Historians of the Armenian genocide
Recipients of the Legion of Honour
21st-century French historians